Mormont is a village of Wallonia and a district of the municipality of Érezée, located in the province of Luxembourg, Belgium.

The village is mentioned in written sources as "Mormont" in 1105. Until 1793, the village was a dependency of the provostry of Durbuy.

References

External links

Former municipalities of Luxembourg (Belgium)